"Different World" is a song by Norwegian DJ and producer Alan Walker, K-391 and Sofia Carson featuring . It was included on Walker's debut studio album of the same name, Different World, which was released on 14 December 2018. The song is a re-worked version of a track originally known as "Sevje" by K-391.

Background 
The song was written by Swedish Grammis-nominated songwriter Shy Martin, among others including Fredrik Borch Olse, Gunnar Greve, Magnus Bertelsen, James Daniel Njie Eriksen, Kenneth Nilsen, Marcus Arnbekk and Mengzhou Hu. It was r eleased alongside an accompanying campaign titled "#CreateADifferentWorld", in which Walker addresses the importance of climate change. He said "I want to use my voice to raise awareness. And that's what this song is about. There is still time, together we can create a different world."

Billboard noted the song as "depicting the sad state of our planet with hard-to-watch images of polluted oceans, forest fires and communities under water," along with suggesting the lack of awareness or pretence regarding the issue of climate change by people in power.

Videos

Lyric video 
The lyric video for the song was released on the same day as the song's release, on 30 November 2018. It was directed and edited by Alexander Zarate Frez. Simon Compagnet had produced the graphics for the video while additional footage was provided by Bradley Wickham and Bror Bror.

For most of the video, images were depicted of oceans filled with trash, air pollution, wildfires, hurricanes, and other kinds of disaster scenarios linked to climate change. For the third quarter of the video, the song takes a more wishful tone and the visuals change to vistas of nature, aiming to show what could be if people worked together to combat climate change.

Vertical video 
An alternative music video was released on 13 December 2018, produced in a vertical format and meant to be viewed on a smartphone in portrait orientation. It was also directed by Alexander Zarate Frez, with Larry Reibman as director of photography. Marie Hjelmerud produced the motion graphics, along with Fredrik Winge as second editor. It also features Sofia Carson inside one of the messages as she sings.

The video was social media-oriented, using platforms like Facebook, Twitter, Instagram and Snapchat as its medium. An excerpt from a speech at the 1992 Rio Summit by Severn Cullis-Suzuki was played near the two-minute mark.

Charts

References

Notes

Sources 

Songs about climate change
2018 songs
Alan Walker (music producer) songs
Electronic songs
Songs written by Alan Walker (music producer)
Songs written by Gunnar Greve
Songs written by Shy Martin
Sony Music singles
Sofia Carson songs